Bath Tramways Company and its successors operated a  horse drawn  tramway service in Bath between 1880 and 1902. From 1903 until its closure in 1939 an expanded route carried electric trams operated by Bath Electric Tramways Company.

History

The first service ran on 24 December 1880. The initial  line was from the Bath Spa railway station via Southgate Street, High Street and Walcot to Grosvenor College. It used six horse drawn cars built by George Starbuck of Birkenhead, with a stable and depot in Kensington.

The service was not profitable and on 26 May 1884 the company was taken over by the Patent Cable Tramways Corporation. Seven further 12-seater cars were purchased. It entered liquidation and was taken over by Dick, Kerr & Co. on 11 August 1888. This was taken over by the Bath Road Car and Tramways Company, who already ran the buses in the area, on 1 April 1889. The horse drawn service continued until 1902 when the company was taken over by Bath Corporation and modernised and electrified by the Bath Electric Tramways Company, a subsidiary of British Electric Traction.

The  tracks were taken up and replaced by a  track. Six electric cars were brought in December 1903 and on 2 January 1904 the new service opened. Additional lines to Bathford, Combe Down, Weston and Oldfield Park were constructed. The company fleet was blue and yellow. There were 18 55-seat tramcars all purchased in 1903 and 1904 from G.F. Milnes & Co. which operated from a new depot in Beehive Yard off Walcot Street. In 1905 an additional line to Newton St Loe opened and proposals were drawn up to connect this with Bristol Tramways although this was never built. To operate this line the fleet was joined by four single-decked 30-seat cars known as 'whippets'. On 3 July 1933, a tram ran away backwards on Wells Road and crashed into another tram. A passenger was killed and fifteen were injured.

In 1936 the company was taken over by the Bristol Tramways and Carriage Company who began to replace the trams with their buses. The Newton St Loe line closed in 1938 with the rest closing in May the following year.

One of the original horse-drawn tramcars has been preserved, and is now at the Ipswich Transport Museum. It was built by Starbuck Car and Wagon Company of Birkenhead as a single deck vehicle around 1880, and operated in Bath until around 1884. It was then purchased by the Bradford and Shelf Tramway Company, where it was probably used as a trailer to a steam tram, although details are sketchy. By 1894 an upper deck had been added, and the tram was sold again to Cambridge Street Tramways, becoming their number 7. The Cambridge system closed in 1914, and the vehicles were sold at auction. Tram number 7 became a workshop extension to a bungalow in Ely, where it remained until it was rescued in 2003 by the museum. The vehicle was renovated between 2012 and 2019, assisted by a grant from the Heritage Lottery Fund, and its previous history became apparent as the layers of paint were stripped away.

Proposal to re-introduce
In 2006 a private group Trams for Bath proposed their re-introduction. In 2015 a further initiative was under discussion by a new group Bath Trams.

In 2017 Bath and North East Somerset council announced it was to carry out a feasibility study of a light rail system. The study was produced by Atkins, and in January 2018, Bath Council identified four routes which could have tram routes and identified that the proposals would need further consideration.

References

Bibliography

External links
 Tramway Badges and Buttons: Bath Electric Tramways

Tram transport in England
4 ft gauge railways in England
Transport in Bath, Somerset